Kron may refer to:

People
Gabriel Kron (1901–1968), electrical engineer
Gerald Kron (1913–2012), astronomer
Kathleen Anne Kron (b. 1956), biologist
Lisa Kron (b. 1961), actress and playwright
Patrick Kron (b. 1953), businessman
Otto Kron (1911–1955), Obersturmbannführer
Robert Kron (b. 1967), ice hockey player
Tommy Kron (1943–2007), basketball player

Other uses
Kron, an iguanodon in the 2000 Disney animated film Dinosaur
2796 Kron, a main-belt asteroid
KRON-TV, a television station (VHF digital channel 7, virtual 4) in San Francisco
 Kron (film), 2019 Malaysian mystery drama film